Roodeschool is a railway station located in Roodeschool, Netherlands. The station was opened on 16 August 1893 and is located at the end of the Sauwerd–Roodeschool railway. The train services are operated by Arriva.

For well over a century, Roodeschool was the northernmost station in the Netherlands, until 28 March 2018, when further along the line, the station Eemshaven was opened, slightly more north. At the same date, the old, head-end station, was closed and a new station for Roodeschool was opened, allowing trains to continue to Eemshaven.

Train service
The following services call at Roodeschool:
 Twice per hour (once per hour on Sundays) local service (stoptrein) Groningen - Roodeschool

References

External links
 Live overview of departing trains
 Roodeschool station Station information
 Public transport planner

Transport in Het Hogeland
Railway stations in Groningen (province)
Railway stations opened in 1893